"A Million Love Songs" is a song by English boy band Take That that featured in their debut studio album, Take That & Party (1992). It was written by lead vocalist Gary Barlow. It was released in the United Kingdom on 28 September 1992 and peaked at number seven on the UK Singles Chart that October. It also reached number 50 in the Netherlands.

Song information
Written by lead vocalist Gary Barlow at the age of 15, it was released as the sixth single from the band's debut studio album, Take That & Party, peaking at number seven in the UK Singles Chart. The two primary instruments are piano, played by Barlow, with a saxophone in the bridges originally scored, performed and recorded by Snake Davis. Take That's longtime saxophonist and music director, Mike Stevens went on to perform these sax parts live, many of them using the extended saxophone part written by Davis, at the end of the song. In January 1993, the song entered the Dutch Top 100 and peaked at number 50. The song was released for airplay in the United States in September 1993, but it failed to chart.

The song was performed in the final of The X Factor's third series in 2006 by eventual winner Leona Lewis, who was joined on stage halfway through the song by all four members of Take That. It was also performed in the second series of The X Factor by eventual winner Shayne Ward and by JLS on the fifth series of X Factor and in sixth series by Lloyd Daniels. Ward's version was released as a B-side to his single "No Promises". The song was also covered by Alexander O'Neal on his 2008 album, Alex Loves.... On the ninth series of The X Factor, the song was performed by eventual winner James Arthur at the bootcamp, playing an uptempo rendition on acoustic guitar.

Critical reception
Larry Flick from Billboard wrote "the boys drip with toothy sincerity. Fluttering harp fills are a bit too much for weak stomachs, while the sax lines give the song a '50s retro pop tone that makes you think of sockhops and make-out point. Too bad it's not prom season." British magazine Music Week commented, "Take That change tack with the ballad A Million Love Songs, all Philadelphia creamy harmonies and poignant phrasing, that's bound to cause another stampede among the teenies. A nagging sax that is given free  to roam is a minor annoyance, but that won't stop this from renewing the group's acquaintance with the Top 20." Simon Williams from NME called it "weepsome", stating the song is "impeccably manufactured", and "one of the few times Take That sound remotely genuine". A reviewer from Staffordshire Sentinel described it as "swooning".

Music video
The music video for the song is shot in black and white, and makes use of the "watercolour" video editing effect which effectively blurs the image. The video is simple and shows the band performing the song with Barlow at the piano. Two versions of the video exist; one has the watercolour effect fading in and out and the other features a hand-drawn cartoon storyline with the members of the band trying to woo an emperor's daughter. "A Million Love Songs" was later published on Take That's official YouTube channel in October 2009. The video has amassed more than 4,9 million views as of September 2021.

Track listings

UK and European CD single (74321 11600 2)
 "A Million Love Songs" (7-inch edit) – 3:53
 "Still Can't Get Over You" – 4:10
 "How Can It Be" – 4:57
 "Don't Take Your Love" – 4:04

UK cassette (74321 11600 4)
 "A Million Love Songs" (7-inch edit) – 3:53
 "A Million Love Songs" (Lovers' mix) – 6:12

UK 7-inch vinyl EP (74321 11630 7)
 "A Million Love Songs" (7-inch edit) – 3:53
 "Still Can't Get Over You" – 4:10
 "How Can It Be" – 4:57
 "Don't Take Your Love" – 4:04

UK limited-edition 7-inch vinyl (74321 11600 7)(with transfer tattoos)
 "A Million Love Songs" (7-inch edit) – 3:53
 "A Million Love Songs" (Lovers' mix) – 6:12

Japanese CD single (BVCP-1022)
 "A Million Love Songs" (live version) – 6:06
 "Satisfied" (live version)
 "Take That Medley" (live version)
 "Why Can't I Wake Up with You" (radio edit) – 3:38
 "A Million Love Songs" (Lovers' mix) – 6:12

Japanese 3-inch CD single (BVDP-85)
 "A Million Love Songs" (7-inch edit) – 3:53
 "A Million Love Songs" (Lovers' mix) – 6:12

Personnel
 Gary Barlow – lead vocals
 Howard Donald – backing vocals
 Jason Orange – backing vocals
 Mark Owen – backing vocals
 Robbie Williams – backing vocals

Charts

Weekly charts

Year-end charts

Certifications

References

Songs about music
Take That songs
1992 singles
1992 songs
Black-and-white music videos
Pop ballads
Songs written by Gary Barlow
Sony Music UK singles